Oklahoma Sooners baseball is the NCAA Division I collegiate baseball team of the University of Oklahoma (OU) based in Norman, Oklahoma.

The Oklahoma Baseball tradition is long and storied, with two national championships in 1951 and 1994, along with numerous All-Americans. Dale Mitchell, Bobby Jack, Jackson Todd, Glen Castle, and Keith Drumright are two-time All-Americans to have played for the Sooners. Their home field is L. Dale Mitchell Baseball Park, named after the aforementioned Dale Mitchell.

Prior to 2006, the Sooners hosted regionals at minor league parks in Oklahoma City, first All Sports Stadium and then the venue now known as Chickasaw Bricktown Ballpark. Scheduling conflicts with Oklahoma City's Triple-A team, currently known as the Oklahoma City Dodgers, led OU to bid for future regionals at its on-campus stadium.

History

The early years
Unlike many programs, such as LSU and USC, Oklahoma did not lack consistency among the coaching ranks in the early to mid 1900s.  Bennie Owen is credited as the first head coach of the Oklahoma Sooners baseball program.  Owen's first season is listed as 1906 and his final season being 1922.  Owen coached the Sooners for a total of 17 years, compiling an overall record of 142–102–4.  In 1923 Bill Owen took over as head coach and remained in the position for 4 years.  During his tenure the program had a .764 winning percentage with a record of 42–13. OU named Lawrence Haskell the third head coach in the programs history in 1927.  He led the Sooners for 15 years, compiling an overall record of 176–74–2.

Jack Baer era
Jack Baer became the fourth head coach of the Oklahoma Sooners baseball program in 1942. In his 10th year as coach, Baer led the program to new heights, claiming the 1951 national championship in baseball for the first time in school history. The Sooners nearly missed out on that title opportunity. An ESPN story published as a backdrop for the Sooners' 2022 Men's College World Series (MCWS) finals appearance noted that legendary OU football coach Bud Wilkinson, also the school's athletic director, "didn't care much for baseball, telling the team they couldn't go to Omaha, even after qualifying." OU president George Lynn Cross intervened, but only provided a bus to transport the team to Omaha, providing insufficient money for hotels. The team left on the 500-mile (800 km) drive to Norman immediately after the title game, and no team members received championship rings until the 50th anniversary of the championship in 2001, by which time several members had died.

Baer went on to coach the Sooners until 1967.  During his 26-year tenure as coach, Baer amassed 281 victories, a .529 winning percentage, and still remains OU's longest tenured baseball coach.

Enos Semore era
Enos Semore replaced Jack Baer in 1968.  Semore became the 5th head coach in the program's history, and led the program through some of its most successful years.  During his 22-year tenure as coach, Semore's teams averaged 38.5 victories a year, claiming 9 conference championships and 2 conference tournament titles.  Under his direction, the Sooners claimed 4 straight Big Eight titles while also making 5 consecutive trips to the MCWS from 1972–1976. His 1976 squad set a school record that still stands today with 62 victories. The 851 victories he compiled while head coach of the Sooners still ranks first in the programs history.  Semore compiled a record of 851–370–1 while at OU.  Semore's career winning percentage of .697 ranks in the top 50 all-time in NCAA Division I history.

Larry Cochell era

Semore resigned just days before the start of the 1990 season for medical reasons. Assistant Stan Meek was named interim coach for the 1990 season, during which the Sooners finished 31–26 overall and failed to make the NCAA Division I baseball tournament for the first time since 1983.  

To replace Meek, the Sooners traveled out west and hired Larry Cochell away from Cal State Fullerton. Cochell replaced legendary coach Augie Garrido at Fullerton when Garrido left for Illinois. During his three seasons at Fullerton, Cochell's teams went 109–68.  Although Fullerton had long been considered a baseball powerhouse, OU offered Cochell a financial package that he could not turn down, and he became the seventh head coach in school history. 

Cochell wasted no time bringing the team back into the national spotlight.  In his first year, Cochell led the team to an overall record of 40–23 and a second-place finish in the Big Eight. The Sooners returned to the NCAA tournament, but were quickly eliminated in regional play, losing their second game to eventual national champion LSU.  The following year, the Sooners tied for the Big Eight conference championship, and once again were awarded with a spot in the postseason.  The Sooners fared much better winning the NCAA Mideast Regional to earn their first trip to the MCWS since 1976.  The Sooners tied for 5th in the 1992 College World Series winning 1 game and losing 2, but Cochell would use the 1992 season to catapult the Sooners to national prominence.  The 1992 team finished the season 43–24 overall.  After a rebuilding year in 1993, Cochell was poised to return the program to glory.

1994 national championship

In 1994, Cochell entered his fourth season at the helm of the Sooner program.  The Sooners breezed through the 1994 regular season with a record of 42–17.  They also posted a 21–9 mark in conference play, but that was only good enough to finish second in the conference.  The Sooners were placed in the NCAA Central Regional along with Arkansas St., Stanford, and Texas.  In their first game of the regional, OU defeated Arkansas St. 10–3, setting up a second round game with Stanford.  Once again OU had no trouble putting runs on the board, defeating Stanford 10–4.  After winning their first two games, OU was in the driver's seat for the remainder of the regional.  With a berth in the regional championship on the line, the Sooners delivered; they defeated Texas 15–4.  Texas avoided elimination to set up a rematch with OU in the championship, but the result turned out the same.  The Sooners claimed the Central Regional championship, defeating the Longhorns 6–3.  The Sooners were on their way to Omaha, earning their 8th trip to the College World Series.

The Sooners were the No. 4 seed in the 1994 College World Series, which set up a first-round game with the No. 5 seed Auburn Tigers.  OU continued their winning ways, defeating the Tigers 5–4.  The win placed the Sooners in the winner's bracket and set up a second-round game against Arizona St.  Arizona St. surprised top-seeded Miami in the opening round 4–0 to advance to the winner's bracket.  OU once again won by a single run, 4–3, to advance to the semi-finals.  After defeating Miami for a second game and eliminating the Hurricanes, the Sun Devils were looking for revenge, but the Sooners rose to the occasion.  Oklahoma eliminated Arizona St., 6–1, to advance to the championship round.  The Sooners played Georgia Tech for the championship, who had also won its first three games in Omaha that year.  OU's bats came alive in the championship game as OU defeated the Yellow Jackets 13–5 to claim the second national title in school history.  Cochell guided the Sooners to a 50–17 overall record after winning the CWS.

Retirement and legacy
On May 1, 2005 Cochell submitted his letter of resignation to Oklahoma.  Cochell resigned after making racial remarks during two separate interviews.  Cochell used racially insensitive remarks to describe Joe Dunigan III who was a freshman outfielder and is an African-American.  The remarks were not during taped interviews, but were brought to the attention of the university by ESPN after the fact.  Cochell would later issue a public statement in which he apologized for the remarks, and the Dunnigan family would later state they forgave Cochell.

Cochell, who had coached for 39 total seasons, was the keeper of the OU baseball program for nearly 15 full seasons.  He led the program through one of the most successful eras of its history, including leading them to the 1994 championship, the first in over four decades, despite the quick exit that engulfed his departure, although he was invited back to the introduction of Pete Hughes as head coach in 2013.

Sunny Golloway era

Sonny Golloway was promoted from associate head coach to interim head coach on May 1, 2005 following the resignation of Larry Cochell.  Golloway held the interim tag for the remainder of the 2005 season posting a 12–6 record.  The Sooners earned an berth in the 2005 NCAA tournament, but were eliminated in the Oxford regional finals by Ole Miss.  Following the 2005 season, the interim tag was removed from the title, and Golloway became head coach of the Oklahoma Sooners baseball program.

Prior to becoming head coach at OU, Golloway returned to Norman for his second stint with the Sooners Program.  Golloway was an assistant coach under Cochell from 1992–1995 before leaving to become the head coach at Oral Roberts.  Golloway would coach a total of 8 seasons at Oral Roberts posting a 335–156 record.  Following the 2003 season, Golloway left Oral Roberts to return to Norman as associate head coach.

In his first full season as head coach of the Sooners, Golloway led the team to a 45–22 record overall.  The 2006 team finished 3rd overall in the Big 12, and earned its second straight NCAA post-season berth.  In the post-season, Oklahoma was awarded a host site for the regional round of the tournament.  After losing their first game to TCU, the Sooners would win 4 straight to earn their first regional title since 1995 and a berth in the super regional round for the first time.  Oklahoma traveled to Houston to face the Rice Owls, with the winner earning a berth in the 2006 College World Series.  Rice won the first game, but OU was able to come back with a victory in game 2 to force a rubber game.  Rice, the No. 2 overall seed that year, was just too much in the pivotal third game of the super regionals, and ended OU's season.

After a promising first full season as coach, expectations for Golloway were increasing.  Unfortunately in 2007, the Sooners never lived up to their potential finishing the season 34–24.  They failed to make the post-season, but Golloway was determined to keep the program moving in the right direction.  The following year, the Sooners finished the season 36–26–1 overall, and once again earned a trip to the post-season.  The Sooners would make it all the way to the Tempe regional finals, before coming up short against Arizona St. to end the 2008 season.

In his fourth full year as head coach at Oklahoma, Golloway was once again able to keep the program moving in the right direction.  OU finished second in the Big 12 posting a 17–10 record in conference play, only a half game behind Texas for the regular season title.  After earning the No. 2 seed in the 2009 Big 12 baseball tournament, the Sooners posted a disappointing 1–2 record in pool play.  Following the Big 12 championship, the Sooners had a record of 41–18.  Despite their poor performance in the Big 12 tournament, they were still rewarded with a host site and the No. 7 national seed in the 2009 NCAA Division I baseball tournament.  After winning their first game in the Norman regional, the Sooners fell to Arkansas in the second round.  The Sooners would bounce back and defeat Washington St. in an elimination, but once again lost to Arkansas.  The Sooners finished the 2009 season 43–20.

In 2010, the Sooners finished 50–18.  The team swept through their regional and won the super regional against the Virginia Cavaliers 2–1.  The Super Regional was highlighted by Cody Reine who had back to back multi-homerun games in games 2 and 3.  The Sooners earned their 10th appearance in the College World Series where they won their first game against the South Carolina Gamecocks 4–3.  The Sooners then lost to the Clemson Tigers and then lost on a walk-off hit to the Gamecocks in a rematch.

After the 2013 season, Golloway left for Auburn.

Pete Hughes era

In 2014, Pete Hughes, who had previously served as head coach of the Virginia Tech Hokies for the previous seven seasons. In his four seasons with the Sooners, he led them to over 30 wins three times, although his team advanced past the Second Round of the Big 12 Tournament just once (2015), with only one NCAA Tournament appearance in 2017, which ended with two losses in the Louisville Regional. After the 2017 season, he was fired by the program.

Skip Johnson era
On June 19, 2017, Skip Johnson was announced as the new head coach of the Sooners. In the 2022 season, Johnson coached the Sooners to the Big 12 Tournament Championship defeating Texas, and to the College World Series defeating Virginia Tech in the Blacksburg Super Regional.

L. Dale Mitchell Baseball Park

L. Dale Mitchell Baseball Park is a baseball stadium in Norman, Oklahoma. It is the home field for the University of Oklahoma Sooners college baseball team. It is named after the former OU player Dale Mitchell who holds OU's career and single-season batting records. The park was originally constructed at a cost of $1.27 million and was dedicated in 1982. After two renovations, the current capacity is 2,700 people.

Conference affiliations
The Missouri Valley Intercollegiate Athletic Association was not officially renamed until 1964.  In 1964 it became the Big Eight, but was nicknamed the Big Six and Big Seven prior to its official renaming.
 Southwest Conference (1914–1918)
 Missouri Valley Intercollegiate Athletic Association/Big Six/Big Seven/Big Eight (1919–1996)
 Big 12 (1997–present)
 Southeastern Conference (joining for 2025 season)

Head coaches

Records are through the end of the 2022 season

Year-by-year NCAA Division I results
Records taken from the 2017 Oklahoma Sooners baseball media guide page 64.

Championships

National championships

Conference tournament championships

OU in the NCAA tournament
The NCAA Division I baseball tournament started in 1947.
The format of the tournament has changed through the years.

Player awards

All Americans
The following is a listing of first team selections.  Other selections are available at Oklahoma's official web site.

 1953
Gene Sheets (2B)
 1971
Glen Castle (SS)
 1972
Bobby Jack (2B)
 1976
 Kelly Snider (1B)
 1979
Nick Capra (2B)
 1983
Ray Hayward (P)
 1985
Bobby Witt (P)

 1986
Kevin Burdick (dh)
 1992
Brian Eldridge (2B)
 1994
Rick Guiterrez (2B)
 1995
Mark Redman (P)
 1997
Javier Flores (C)
 2000
Jeff Bajenaru (utl)
 2009
J.T. Wise (C) – NCBWA

All College World Series
The following is a listing of first team selections.  Other selections are available at USC's official web site.
^ denotes player was named MOP of the College World Series

1973
Bob Shirley (P)
1992
Byron Matthews (OF)

1994
Ryan Minor (1B)
Rick Gutierrez (2B)
Darvin Traylor (OF)
Chip Glass^ (OF)
Mark Redman (P)

All-Conference teams
Selections from 1958 were affiliated with the Big 7 conference, selections from 1976–1996 were affiliated with the Big 8 conference, and selections from 1997 on were affiliated with the Big 12 conference.
^ and ^^ respectively denote Big Eight and Big 12 Conference Player of the Year
* and ** respectively denote  denotes Big Eight and Big 12 Conference Newcomer of the Year

1958
Eddie Fisher (P)
Dennis Price (2B)
1959
Brewster Hobby (OF)
Don Nipp (C)
1960
George Kernek (1B)
Paul Mersch (1B)
Don Nipp (C)
1961
George Kernek (1B)
1963
Dale Mitchell (OF)
1964
Jann Christian (SS)
John Kern (1B)
Dale Mitchell (OF)
1965
Carl Schreiner (OF)
1966
Jay Cronley (2B)
1967
Gary Harper (2B)
Tom Maxwell (3B)
Ralph Rickey (OF)
1968
Gary Brooks (C)
Dick Turner (OF)
1969
Chris Rickey (3B)
Mike Swenton (OF)
1970
Scott Harrington (2B)
Bobby Jack (1B)
Mike Swenton (OF)
1971
Glen Gastle (SS)
Bobby Jack (1B)
Mike Swenton (OF)
Gary Weese (P)
1972
Bobby Jack (1B)
Joe Simpson (OF)
Jackson Todd (P)
Bill Severns (OF)
1973
Joe Simpson (OF)
Jackson Todd (P)
Mike Umfleet (3B)
1974
Keith Drumright (2B)
Kenny King (OF)
Stan Lawrence (dh)
Stan Meek (P)
Mike Umfleet (3B)
1975
Jacky Parish (C)
Bill Severns (OF)
Bob Shirley (P)
Mike Umfleet (3B)

1976
Terry Bogener (OF)
Keith Drumright (2B)
Gary Krug (dh)
Kelly Snider (1B)
1977
Gary Krug (1B)
Roger LaFrancois (C)
Mark Nipp (P)
Gary Thweatt (OF)
1978
Terry Bogener (OF)
Mark Nipp (P)
1979
Nick Capra (2B)
David Luethy (SS)
Bryan Stafford (OF)
Tommy Thompson (3B)
1980
Robb Glendening (2B)
Fran Meraz (OF)
1981
Ray Hayward (p/1B)
John Russell (OF)
1982
Kevin Bates (2B)
John Russell (OF)
1983
Ray Hayward (p/dh)
Ron Leon (OF)
Jay Searcy (3B)
Paul Williams (OF)
1984
Ron Leon (OF)
Rusty McGinnis (1B)
Bobby Witt (P)
1985
Rusty McGinnis (1B)
Steve Peters (P)
John Toal (2B)
Bobby Witt (P)
1986
Kevin Burdick (utl)
Scott Hamilton (P)
Kevin Pearson (SS)
1987
Jack Armstrong (P)
Baine Brooks (OF)
Kevin Burdick (2B)
Chris Ebright (OF)
1988
Chris Ebright (OF)
1989
Mark Cole (SS)
Darron Cox^ (C)
Chris Ebright (OF)
Kevin King (P)

1990
Scott Campbell (of/3B)
1991
Brian Eldridge (2B)
Scott Moore (P)
Mary Neff (OF)
1992
Brian Eldridge (2B)
Jason Evans (dh)
Zak Krislock (P)
Casey Mendenhall (P)
1993
Rick Gutierrez (2B)
Rich Hills (SS)
1994
Bucky Buckles (P)
Rick Gutierrez^ (2B)
Rich Hills (SS)
Mark Redman* (P)
Darvin Traylor (OF)
1995
Javier Flores (C)
Rich Hills (SS)
Mark Redman (P)
Aric Thomas (OF)
1996
Bobby Brown (OF)
Javier Flores (C)
1997
Casey Bookout (dh)
Javier Flores (C)
Geoff Geary (P)
1998
Casey Bookout (dh)
Geoff Geary (P)
Corey Hart (inf)
Willy Hill (OF)
Derek Wathan (SS)
1999
Casey Bookout (dh)
2000
Jeff Bajenaru (OF)
Jason Bartlett (3B)
2001
Greg Dobbs** (OF)
2002
Jason Fransz (OF)
2003
Eddie Cornejo (2B)
2004
Jarod McAuliff (P)
Russell Raley (2B)
2007
Bryant Hernandez (inf)
Jame Johnson (OF)
J.T. Wise^^ (C)

Conference All-Tournament teams
Selections from 1976–1996 were affiliated with the Big 8 conference, and selections from 1997 on were affiliated with the Big 12 conference.
^ denotes player was selected as the MVP of the tournament.

1976
Keith Drumright (2B)
Greg Stitzinger (3B)
Roger LaFrancois (C)
Ken Palmer (P)
1977
Greg Krug (1B)
Art Toal (2B)
Mike Cunico (SS)
Tommy Thompson (3B)
Gary Thweatt (OF)
Terry Bogener (dh)
Roger LaFrancois (C)
Mark Nipp^ (P)
1978
Don Morris (OF)
Mark Nipp (P)
1979
Nick Capra^ (2B)
David Luethy (SS)
Donnie Graham (OF)
Josh Randall (P)
Tom Kohl (P)
1982
Greg Carlton (3B)
John Russell (OF)
Darrell Rodgers (P)
1983
Ron Leon (OF)
Ray Hayward (P)
Pete Zeegers (P)
1984
Rusty McGinnis (1B)
Jay Searcy (3B)
Ron Leon (OF)
John Toal (dh)
Keith Hamilton (P)
1985
Rusty McGinnis (1B)
Jim Richardson (3B)
Andy Franks (OF)
Keith Hamilton (P)
Steve Peters (P)

1986
John Toal (2B)
Tony Gwinn (C)
Chris Stull (OF)
Scott Hamilton (P)
1987
Kevin Burdick (SS)
Chris Ebright (OF)
Baine Brooks (OF)
Jack Armstrong (P)
Mike Hensley (P)
1988
Mark Cole (SS)
Chris Ebright (OF)
Todd Butler (OF)
Matt Anderson (dh)
Chris Burgin (P)
1989
Mark Cole (SS)
1991
Derrick White (1B)
Brian Eldridge (2B)
Matt Ruebel (P)
1992
Jason Evans (3B)
Greg Norton (SS)
Scott Marr (OF)
Britt Bonneau (OF)
Clifton Foster (P)
1993
Rich Hills (3B)
1994
Ryan Minor (1B)
Rick Gutierrez (2B)
M.J. Mariani (3B)
Rich Hills (SS)
Chip Glass (OF)
Bucky Buckles (P)
1995
Tristan Paul (3B)

1996
Javier Flores (C)
Brian Shackelford (util)
1997
Javier Flores (C)
Corey Hart (2B)
Derek Wathan (SS)
Brian Shackelford^ (OF)
Jeff Andra (P)
1998
Rick Park (dh)
1999
Bobby Walters (OF)
Rick Park (dh)
2000
Rick Park (1B)
Zach Lekse (2B)
2001
Jason Bartlett (3B)
Greg Dobbs (util)
2002
Jason Fransz (OF)
Mark Roberts (P)
2007
Joseph Hughes (OF)
Aaron Reza (3B)
2008
Andrew Doyle (P)
2009
Andrew Doyle (P)
Jamie Johnson (OF)
J.T Wise (C)

See also
List of NCAA Division I baseball programs

References

External links